Annette Charles (née Cardona; March 5, 1948 – August 3, 2011) was an American actress, dancer, and educator best known for her role as Charlene "Cha-Cha" DiGregorio in the 1978 feature film Grease. She made several appearances on television as well.

Early life
Charles was born Annette Cardona in Los Angeles, California of Mexican and Italian ancestry.

Career
Charles became an actress, and was best known for her role as Charlene "Cha Cha" DiGregorio in the 1978 feature film Grease. She made several appearances on television as well.

Charles later earned a bachelor's degree from Antioch University Los Angeles in psychology and theater, and a master's degree in social work from New York University before becoming a speech communication professor in the Chicano Studies department at California State University, Northridge.

Personal life and death
Charles died on August 3, 2011 in Los Angeles from lung cancer, aged 63. She initially was hospitalized for pneumonia.

Credits

References

External links
 

1948 births
2011 deaths
Actresses from Los Angeles
American film actresses
American television actresses
California State University, Northridge faculty
Deaths from cancer in California
New York University alumni
21st-century American women
American people of Italian descent
American actresses of Mexican descent
Hispanic and Latino American actresses